West Scio is an unincorporated community and census-designated place (CDP) in Linn County, Oregon, United States. As of the 2010 census, the population was 120.

Demographics

References

Unincorporated communities in Linn County, Oregon
Unincorporated communities in Oregon
Census-designated places in Oregon
Census-designated places in Linn County, Oregon